Wesley Church may refer to:

Wesley Church, Melbourne, Australia, a Uniting Church
Wesley Church, Perth, Australia, a Uniting Church
Wesley Church, Albany, Australia, a Uniting Church
Wesley Church, Seremban, Malaysia
Wesley Church, Egmore, Tamil Nadu, India, a Church of South India church

See also
Wesley Methodist Church (disambiguation)
Wesley United Methodist Church (disambiguation)
Wesley Memorial Church, Oxford, England
Wesley Methodist Episcopal Church, Delaware, United States
Wesley Temple AME Church, Akron, Ohio, United States
Wesley AME Zion Church, Philadelphia, Pennsylvania, United States
Wesley Brethren Church, Wesley, Texas, United States